Elena Mosaner, formerly known as Beloff, is a Russian-born American National Guild of Hypnotists (NGH) Certified hypnotherapist and professional certified coach by ICF (International Coach Federation), author and filmmaker. She has her own private practice in New York City and the San Diego Area. Mosaner founded the practice Inside Hypnosis in New York City, and is the founder of the AlphaMind self hypnosis app.

Hypnosis 
Mosaner hypnotized 100 people at one time for the film "The Crowd," which was shot in January 2015 by Darius Khondji. Elena Mosaner was cast at the suggestion of Advanced Hypnosis Center's Jeffrey Rose. "The Crowd" was shown at French artist Philippe Parreno's art installation "H{N)Y P N(Y}OSIS" at New York City's Park Avenue Armory. The show opened on June 11, 2015.

In 2015 Mosaner (then Beloff) was featured as one of the top rated hypnotherapists for exercise motivation in New York City by the New York Post. Mosaner's clients describe the change they were able to achieve with the help of hypnotherapy.

In 2016 Elena Mosaner was interviewed by Good Morning America about hypnosis for exercise motivation. She hypnotizes a client to train for a NYC half marathon and explains how hypnosis works.

In 2017, The New York Times featured Elena Mosaner as one of the top clinical hypnotists in New York City for weight loss. Several of Mosaner's clients were interviewed about the changes they were able to achieve through hypnosis.

Mosaner moved her practice to California and is considered one of the leading hypnotists in the San Diego Area. She was lauded for her work coaching athletes for peak performance.

Filmmaking and writing
As a filmmaker, Mosaner's first film, the documentary Zaritsas: Russian Women in New York (2010), screened at the Astoria/Long Island Film Festival in October 2010.Zaritsas was produced by actor Vincent D'Onofrio. Since then Elena Mosaner has formed her own production company EB Productions, LLC. Mosaner's films tend to explore the concepts of stereotypes and misconceptions.

On February 16, 2013, Elena Mosaner uploaded a video of a gay man standing up to a homophobic subway "preacher". The "Gay Subway Hero" caught the attention of the Internet and the media and went viral gaining over 800,000 views in just a few days.

In February 2014, Elena Mosaner and veteran science fiction writer John Zakour collaborated on "Quantum Voyeur", an interactive novel about time traveling tourists. The novella was published by Serealites Press.

Mosaner appeared as a featured hypnotist on the "Superhumans" episode of The History Channel series In Search Of...

References

External links

Russian emigrants to the United States
American filmmakers
American hypnotists
Date of birth missing (living people)
Living people
Year of birth missing (living people)